Malonakaryakovo (Kese Näkäräk) is a rural locality (a village) and the administrative centre of Staroarzamatovsky Selsoviet, Mishkinsky District, Bashkortostan, Russia. The population was 454 as of 2010. There are 6 streets.

Geography 
Malonakaryakovo is located 18 km northeast of Mishkino (the district's administrative centre) by road. Staroarzamatovo is the nearest rural locality.

References 

Rural localities in Mishkinsky District